Creag Dhubh (658 m) is a hill in the Grampian Mountains of Scotland. It is located in the Lochaber region, east of Roybridge.

A rounded hill, Creag Dhubh separates Glen Spean to the south and lower Glen Roy to the north.

References

Marilyns of Scotland
Grahams
Mountains and hills of Highland (council area)